The Vale and Downland Museum is a local history museum in the market town of Wantage, Oxfordshire, England. 

Often described as a hidden gem the museum is housed in the 'Old Surgery', Church Street, in the centre of the town, opposite the Church of St Peter and St Paul

It's galleries present the cultural heritage of the Vale of White Horse region around Wantage. They have a Victorian kitchen, Iron Age skeleton, a life sized bronze statue of Wantage born Lester Piggott, a bust of Sir John Betjeman, Williams F1 display and lots more.

There is a lovely café housed in the museum, serving homemade breakfasts and lunches and a selection of homemade cakes.

The museum is a community hub which has many things to offer the community. A programme of adult talks, a research library, a monthly book group, monthly music sessions for pre-schoolers as well as themed family days throughout the school holidays

Admission to the museum is free but as a registered charity (Charity No. 1126995) they rely on the generosity of visitors to continue preserving the local history and putting on community events.

References

External links 
 

Museums in Oxfordshire
Local museums in Oxfordshire
Art museums and galleries in Oxfordshire
Wantage